Dickens of London is a 1976 television miniseries from Yorkshire Television based on the life of English novelist Charles Dickens. Both Dickens and his father John were played by British actor Roy Dotrice. The series was written by Wolf Mankowitz and Marc Miller. In the United States, the series was shown in 1977.

The series of 13 episodes of 60 minutes was directed by Michael Ferguson (6 episodes) and Marc Miller (7 episodes), who was also the series' producer, with David Cunliffe as executive producer. Mankowitz's book, Dickens of London, published by Weidenfeld and Nicolson in 1976, was based on the detailed research he made while writing the screenplay.

Background
Each of the 13 episodes of Dickens of London is a flashback, with Charles Dickens (Roy Dotrice), by now an internationally famous novelist, in America during a reading tour of 1869, looking back over his life. Dickens the boy (Simon Bell) is shown unhappily pasting labels onto pots of shoe blacking, while Dickens as a young man (Gene Foad) is revealed as a genius who is becoming aware of his powers and trying to find his way in the world. Mary Hogarth (Lois Baxter) is the middle one of the three Hogarth daughters and is portrayed as the one person with whom Dickens seems to have been able to share his work. She dies suddenly aged seventeen and Dickens wears her ring on his little finger for the rest of his life. Georgina Hogarth (Christine McKenna), the youngest of the three Hogarth daughters, comes to live with the couple to help run the household, at the request of her oldest sister Catherine Dickens. The relationship Dickens developed with the young actress Ellen Ternan is not mentioned in the series, nor is Dickens' separation from his wife, Catherine, in 1858. The series is mainly concerned with the influence upon Dickens of his improvident father, John Dickens (Roy Dotrice), who was a Naval clerk and who always spent more than he earned. He is portrayed as an alcoholic and it is suggested that this was the source of the family's financial difficulties. The script includes passages from Dickens' works, woven into the dialogue, creating signposts for readers of Dickens' work.

Episodes
Episode 1: Mask (broadcast 28 September 1976)
Episode 2: The Deed (broadcast 5 October 1976)
Episode 3: Blacking (broadcast 12 October 1976)
Episode 4: Love (broadcast 19 October 1976)
Episode 5: Success (broadcast 26 October 1976)
Episode 6: Fame (broadcast 2 November 1976)
Episode 7: Money (broadcast 9 November 1976)
Episode 8: Possession (broadcast 16 November 1976)
Episode 9: Dreams (broadcast 23 November 1976)
Episode 10: Magic (broadcast 30 November 1976)
Episode 11: Nightmare (broadcast 7 December 1976)
Episode 12: Angel (broadcast 14 December 1976)
Episode 13: Memories (broadcast 21 December 1976)

Cast
Roy Dotrice as Charles and John Dickens
Diana Coupland as Elizabeth Dickens
Adrienne Burgess as Catherine Dickens
Gene Foad as Charles Dickens as a young man
Lois Baxter as Mary Hogarth
Simon Bell as Charles Dickens as a boy
Paul Nelson as Bob Fagin
Graham Faulkner as Frederick Dickens
Holly Palance as Miss Baldwin
Trevor Bowen as John Forster
Robert Longden as Hablot Knight Browne
Lynsey Baxter as  Orfling
Paul Lavers as James Lamert
Michael Macowan as Sir Giles
Claire McLellan as Letitia Dickens
Pheona McLellan as Fanny Dickens as a child
George Waring as Huffam
Karen Dotrice as Maria Beadnell
Derek Francis as Stage Manager
Raymond Francis as Mr. Beadnell
Robin Halstead as Kolle
Richard Hampton as Daniel Maclise
William Hoyland as Count Alfred d'Orsay
Patsy Kensit as Young Georgina Hogarth
Christine McKenna as Adult Georgina Hogarth
Ben Kingsley as Dr. John Elliotson
Richard Leech as Mr. Hogarth
Anthony May as Hullah
John Nettles as Mr. Macrone
Vernon Dobtcheff as Legal Gentleman
Connie Booth as Sophie
David Healy as Commissioner Wentworth

References

External links
Review of Dickens of London on dvdtalk.com

Works about Charles Dickens
ITV television dramas
Television series set in the 1830s
1970s British drama television series
Television series by Yorkshire Television
1976 British television series debuts
1976 British television series endings
Period television series
Television series by ITV Studios
Television series set in the 19th century
Cultural depictions of Charles Dickens
1970s British television miniseries